Duke Hu of Qi (reigned 9th century BC) was the sixth recorded ruler of the ancient Chinese state of Qi during the Western Zhou Dynasty.  His personal name was Lü Jing (呂靜), ancestral name Jiang (姜), and Duke Hu was his posthumous title.

Duke Hu was a younger son of Duke Gui of Qi.  When Duke Gui died, Duke Hu's older half-brother Buchen ascended the throne, to be posthumously known as Duke Ai of Qi.  Duke Ai had a dispute with the marquis of Qi's neighbouring state Ji (紀).  King Yi of Zhou sided with Marquis of Ji and executed Duke Ai by boiling him to death.

King Yi then installed Duke Hu on the throne.

Duke Hu moved the capital of Qi from Yingqiu (later known as Linzi) to Bogu.  The move was resented by the people of Yingqiu, who rebelled under the leadership of Duke Hu's half-brother Shan, who was the younger full-brother of Duke Ai. Duke Hu was killed and Shan ascended the throne, to be known as Duke Xian of Qi.

Ancestry

References

Monarchs of Qi (state)
9th-century BC Chinese monarchs